Wu Ching may refer to:

Wu Ching (judoka) (born 1974), Hong Kong judoka
Wu Jing (Han dynasty) (died 203), military general under the warlord Sun Jian during the late Han dynasty, whose name can also be romanized as Wu Ching
Five Classics (五經), a collection of ancient Confucian books, see Four Books and Five Classics
Wu Ho-ching (born 1991), Hong Kong-based tennis player

See also
Wu Jing (disambiguation)
Wujing (disambiguation)